The voiced labial–palatal (or labio-palatal) approximant is a type of consonantal sound, used in some spoken languages. It has two constrictions in the vocal tract: with the tongue on the palate, and rounded at the lips.

The labial–palatal approximant can in many cases be considered the semivocalic equivalent of the close front rounded vowel .

Some languages, though, have a palatal approximant that is unspecified for rounding, and therefore cannot be considered the semivocalic equivalent of either  or its unrounded counterpart . An example of such language is Spanish, in which the labialized palatal approximant (not a semivowel) appears allophonically with rounded vowels in words such as ayuda  'help'. See palatal approximant for more information.

There is also the labialized postpalatal approximant in some languages, which is articulated slightly more back compared with the place of articulation of the prototypical labialized palatal approximant, though not as back as the prototypical labialized velar approximant. It can be considered the semivocalic equivalent of the close central rounded vowel . The equivalent X-SAMPA symbols are H_o, H_", w_+ and w_", respectively. Other possible transcriptions include a centralized and labialized  ( in the IPA, j_"_w in X-SAMPA) and a non-syllabic  ( in the IPA, }_^ in X-SAMPA).

Especially in broad transcription, the labialized postpalatal approximant may be transcribed as a palatalized and labialized velar approximant ( in the IPA, w' or w_j in X-SAMPA).

Compressed palatal approximant
There is no dedicated diacritic for compression in the IPA. The spread-lip diacritic  may also be used with a labialized approximant letter  as an ad hoc symbol, though technically 'spread' means unrounded.

Features
Features of the compressed palatal approximant:

Its place of articulation is palatal and in addition it is endo-labialized, which is accomplished by raising the body of the tongue toward the palate while approximating the lips.

Occurrence
Because the labialized palatal approximant is assumed to have compression, and few descriptions cover the distinction, some examples in the table below may actually have protrusion.

Protruded palatal approximant

As there are no diacritics in the IPA to distinguish protruded and compressed rounding, an old diacritic for labialization, will be used here as an ad hoc symbol for the protruded palatal approximant.

Acoustically, this sound is "between" the more typical compressed palatal approximant  and the non-labialized palatal approximant .

Features
Features of the protruded palatal approximant:

Its place of articulation is labial–palatal, which is accomplished by raising the body of the tongue toward the palate while approximating the lips.

Occurrence

Notes

References

External links
 

Palatal consonants
Bilabial consonants
Oral consonants
Co-articulated consonants
Central consonants
Pulmonic consonants